The 2019 Sheikh Jassim Cup was the 41st edition of the cup competition for football teams from Qatar. It was changed from a group staged pre-season tournament featuring all Qatari Stars League sides, to a one-off match between the previous seasons Qatar Stars League winners and Emir of Qatar Cup winners.

Match details

References

2019
2019–20 in Qatari football